Carenza Rachel Lewis  (born 30 November 1963) is a British academic archaeologist and television presenter.

Early life
Lewis received her formal education at the school of the Church of England Community of All Hallows, in Suffolk. She studied archaeology and anthropology at Girton College, Cambridge.

Field and academic career
In 1985, she joined the Royal Commission on the Historical Monuments of England as a field archaeologist for the Wessex area. During part of her time with the Commission she was seconded to the History Department of the University of Birmingham to research the relationship between settlement and landscape in the East Midlands. She followed this with a similar project in Hampshire and the Isle of Wight.

Lewis was elected a Fellow of the Society of Antiquaries of London in 1998. In 1999, she was elected a visiting fellow of Corpus Christi College, Cambridge, where she was a Senior Research Associate and Affiliated Lecturer. In 2004, she took on a new post at Cambridge to promote undergraduate archaeology, and created Access Cambridge Archaeology. In 2015, Lewis was appointed to the Professorial Chair of 'Public Understanding of Research' at the University of Lincoln.

Television career
In the early 1990s she joined the team presenting the Time Team series, a new television programme designed to make archaeology accessible for the general public, which was first broadcast on Channel 4 Television in 1994. She appeared on the show from 1993 to 2005, appearing each season from the first through the twelfth. The ratings success of the Time Team series led to further television presenting commissions for Lewis, including the series House Detectives (1997–2002).

In 2000, Lewis presented an episode of the BBC's theoretical history programme entitled What If, where she examined the failed revolt of Queen Boudicca and the Iceni against the Roman Empire in AD 60. She also devised and presented a series called Sacred Sites for HTV.

In 2010, she appeared in the television series Michael Wood's Story of England.

In 2022, she rejoined the Time Team crew for its Youtube revival.

Personal life
Lewis has three children. In 2000, she appeared in national print media detailing her experiences as one of a number of victims of medical misdiagnosis at the hands of Dr James Elwood in the late 1990s.

Publications

Aston, Mick and Lewis, Carenza (eds.) (1994) The Medieval Landscape of Wessex Oxford: Oxbow
Lewis, Carenza, Mitchell-Fox, Patrick and Dyer, Christopher (1997) Village, Hamlet and Field: Changing Medieval Settlements in Central England Manchester University Press
Lewis, Carenza, Harding, Phil and Aston, Mick (2000) Time Team's Timechester: a companion to archaeology; ed. Tim Taylor London: Macmillan
Aberg, Alan and Lewis, Carenza (eds.) (2000) The Rising Tide: Archaeology and Coastal Landscapes Oxford: Oxbow

References

External links
Access Cambridge Archaeology
My inspiration: Carenza Lewis talks to the Guardian
Carenza Lewis's Home Page at the University of Lincoln

1963 births
British archaeologists
Academics of the University of Cambridge
Academics of the University of Birmingham
Living people
Fellows of the Society of Antiquaries of London
Fellows of Corpus Christi College, Cambridge
Place of birth missing (living people)
Archaeologists appearing on Time Team
British women archaeologists
Fellows of the Higher Education Academy
People of the Royal Commission on the Historical Monuments of England